B. crocea may refer to:

 Bertholdia crocea, a Central American moth
 Bloomeria crocea, a North American geophyte
 Bomarea crocea, a flowering plant
 Bulbine crocea, a flowering plant